Garegin Abramovich Apresov (6 January 1890 – 11 September 1941) was a Soviet diplomat, most notable for his tenure in Xinjiang during Sheng Shicai's rule.

Life 

Garegin A. Apresov (Apresoff) was born to an Armenian family in Qusar in what was then Baku Governorate in Caucasus Viceroyalty of the Russian Empire. He studied law at the Moscow State University and graduated in 1914. From 1914 until 1917 he served in the army. He joined the Communist Party in 1918. From 1917 to 1918 he was the President of the Lankaran Municipal Council. In March 1918 he was named a member of a government's directorate in Baku and later a member of the Directorate for Food in Baku. In the same year, he became a member of the Revolutionary Tribunal in Saratov. From 1918 to 1919 he was the Leader of the Provincial Justice Department in Saratov.

In 1920, he was involved in underground activity in the Caucasus.

From 1921 to 1921, Apresov served as Deputy People's Commissar for Justice of the Azerbaijan SSR and as a commander of a brigade of the Red Army. Between 1921 and 1922 he was a member of the Collegiate of the People's Commissars for Justice in the Georgian SSR.

From 1922 to 1923 he served as the Soviet Consul in Rasht, Persia and then from 1923 to 1926 in Mashhad, Persia. For some time he was also a representative of the Foreign Department of the Joint State Political Directorate (INO OGPU) and Soviet Interim Commissioner for Persia (1923–24).

Between September 1927 and July 1928, Apresov served as a member of the Military Collegiate of the Supreme Court of the Soviet Union, but resigned at his own request. From 1927 to 1932 he was a NKID agent in Baku. He was NKID's plenipotentiary before the Council of People's Commissars of the Azerbaijan SSR in 1929 and the Uzbek SSR and the Soviet Central Asia in 1930.

In 1935, he was named the Soviet General Consul and Representative of the INO OGPU in Urumqi, Xinjiang, China. From 1935 to 1936 he was Chief of the Second Eastern Department of the People's Commissariat of Foreign Affairs of the Soviet Union (NKID).

Arrest and death 

In March 1937 he was recalled from service in China and arrested. He was dismissed from the NKID on 13 July 1937. On 13 July 1940 he was sentenced to 10 years in prison under the accusation of the anti-Soviet activity based on the Art. 58-10 RSFSR Penal Code. On 8 September 1941, on the basis of Decree No. GKO-634ss, without initiating a criminal case and conducting preliminary and trial proceedings, the Military Collegium of the Supreme Court of the USSR, chaired by Vasily Ulrich (members of the collegium D. Ya. Kandibin and Vasiliy Bukanov), sentenced Apresov and 161 prisoners of the Oryol Prison to death penalty under Art. 58-10 RSFSR Penal Code. He was shot on 11 September 1941 in the Medvedev Forest near Oryol, in an event known as the Medvedev Forest massacre.

References

Notes

Books 

 

1890 births
1941 deaths
People from Qusar District
People from Baku Governorate
Soviet Armenians
Armenian communists
Soviet diplomats
Moscow State University alumni
Great Purge victims from Armenia
Armenian people executed by the Soviet Union
People executed by the Soviet Union by firearm
Members of the Communist Party of the Soviet Union executed by the Soviet Union